Ren Cancan (born April 26, 1986 in Jining, Shandong) is a female Chinese boxer who has won three world championships. She took up boxing in 2002 and won the silver medal in the 2012 Summer Olympics in London in the Women's Boxing – Flyweight Division as southpaw, she is also a bronze medalist of women's 51 kg title at 2016 Olympics in Rio de Janeiro, Brazil. She lost in both of her Olympic Games to the double-champion Nicola Adams.

Her official birthdate is January 26, 1988, as registered with the international boxing association, but she told Reuters in Chinese through a translator, that her actual birthdate is April 26, 1986.  January 26, 1988 is nine months after April 26, 1987 of the prior year, and East Asian age reckoning often used conception date for girls in the past, but that does not explain the extra year discrepancy coming from the translator.

See also
 China at the 2012 Summer Olympics – Boxing

References

1986 births
Living people
People from Jining
Sportspeople from Shandong
Chinese women boxers
Olympic boxers of China
Olympic medalists in boxing
Olympic silver medalists for China
Boxers at the 2012 Summer Olympics
Boxers at the 2016 Summer Olympics
Medalists at the 2012 Summer Olympics
2016 Olympic bronze medalists for China
Asian Games medalists in boxing
Asian Games gold medalists for China
Boxers at the 2010 Asian Games
AIBA Women's World Boxing Championships medalists
Medalists at the 2010 Asian Games
Flyweight boxers